The Régional 1 Mayotte is the top division of football in Mayotte. Organized by the Ligue de Football de Mayotte, the league was founded in 1992.

2018–19 clubs
AS Jumeaux de M'zouazia (Mzouazia)
AS Rosador (Passamainty)
AS Sada
ASC Abeilles (Mtsapere)
ASC Kawéni (Mamoudzou)
Diables Noirs (Combani)
Etincelles (Hamjago)
FC Koropa
FC Mtsapéré
FC Sohoa
Foudre 2000 de Dzoumogné
Tchanga SC (Mtsangamoudji)
UCS Sada

Previous winners

1982-91 : not known
1992 : AS Sada
1993 : AS Rosador (Passamainty)
1994 : AS Rosador (Passamainty)
1995 : AS Rosador (Passamainty)
1996 : AS Sada
1997 : AS Rosador (Passamainty)
1998 : AS Sada
1999 : AS Rosador (Passamainty)
2000 : AS Rosador (Passamainty)
2001 : AS Rosador (Passamainty)
2002 : FC Kani-Bé
2003 : FC Kani-Bé
2004 : AS Sada
2005 : FC Mtsapéré
2006 : FC Mtsapéré
2007 : FC Mtsapéré
2008 : FC Mtsapéré
2009 : AS Rosador (Passamainty)
2010 : FC Mtsapéré
2011 : ASC Abeilles
2012 : FC Koropa
2013 : FC Mtsapéré
2014 : FC Mtsapéré
2015 : FC Mtsapéré
2016 : Foudre 2000 de Dzoumogné
2017 : FC Mtsapéré
2018 : FC Mtsapéré
2019 : FC Mtsapéré

External links
RSSSF competition history

Football competitions in Mayotte
Mayotte
Football leagues in Overseas France
1992 establishments in Mayotte
Sports leagues established in 1992